Fajlit is a Syrian village in the Duraykish District in Tartous Governorate. According to the Syria Central Bureau of Statistics (CBS), Fajlit had a population of 2,220 in the 2004 census.

References

Alawite communities in Syria
Populated places in Duraykish District